Technique or techniques may refer to:

Music
 The Techniques, a Jamaican rocksteady vocal group of the 1960s
Technique (band), a British female synth pop band in the 1990s
Technique (album), by New Order, 1989
Techniques (album), by Modern Baseball, 2014
"Technique", a song by Pat Boone from his EP Four by Pat, 1957

Other uses
 Technique (newspaper), the newspaper of the Georgia Institute of Technology, U.S.
 Technique Polytechnic Institute, in West Bengal, India
 Technique Stadium, a football stadium in Whittington Moor, Chesterfield, Derbyshire

See also

 Technical (disambiguation)
 Technology, the sum of techniques, skills, methods, and processes used in the production of goods or services
 Skill, the ability to carry out a task with determined results
 Scientific technique, any systematic way of obtaining information about a scientific nature